Ragsdale v. Wolverine World Wide, Inc., 535 U.S. 81 (2002), is a U.S. labor law case, concerning the scope of federal preemption against state law for labor rights.

Facts
Ragsdale claimed her job was unjustly terminated. The Department of Labor had a penalty to make employers notify employees of the rules for securing more generous family or medical leave, than existed under the Family and Medical Leave Act of 1993 (FMLA) guarantees employees 12 weeks unpaid leave.

Opinion of the Court

The Supreme Court held by five to four that the FMLA precluded the right of the Department of Labor to draft penalty rules.

Dissent
Justice O'Connor dissented (joined by Justices Ginsburg, Souter, and Breyer) holding that nothing prevented the rule, and it was the Department of Labor's job to enforce the law.

See also

United States labor law

References

External links
 

United States labor case law
United States Supreme Court cases
United States Supreme Court cases of the Rehnquist Court
Wolverine World Wide
2002 in United States case law